Francisco Regalado Rodríguez (1 May 1881 – 2 May 1966) was a Spanish admiral who served as Minister of the Navy of Spain between 1945 and 1951, during the Francoist dictatorship.

References

1881 births
1958 deaths
Defence ministers of Spain
Government ministers during the Francoist dictatorship